UAVision Aeronautics is a company with more than 15 years of experience in the development of Unmanned aerial vehicles and subsystems. It initially focused on the development and manufacture of autopilots and communication systems. UAvision has provided UAS platforms in four continents operating in the most diverse environments. In addition to an important collaboration with the European Union and the Portuguese Armed Forces, the company is present in international markets, namely Brazil, Nigeria, Angola, South Korea, India, United Arab Emirates and Germany. UAvision has also participated in Exercise REP(MUS) since 2019. In 2020, UAVision and Indian VEDA Defense Systems signed an agreement which focuses on the transfer of technology.

Products 
UAVison provides the following products:

 UAV OGASSA OGS42;
 UAV OGASSA OGS42 VTOL;
 UAV SPYRO;
 GIMBAL;
 Fire Detection System;
 Ground Control Systems.

Users 

 Portuguese Navy: (UAV OGASSA OGS42 VTOL and UAV SPYRO);
 Portuguese Air Force: (UAV OGASSA OGS42 and UAV OGASSA OGS42 VTOL);
Polícia Judiciária: (UAV OGASSA OGS42 VTOL and UAV SPYRO);
National Republican Guard: (UAV SPYRO).

 Nigerian Air Force.

References 

Defence companies of Portugal
Unmanned aerial vehicle manufacturers
2005 establishments in Portugal
Privately held companies of Portugal
Multinational companies headquartered in Portugal